Victoria ( NST) is an incorporated town in Conception Bay located approximately midway on the Bay de Verde Peninsula of Newfoundland and Labrador, Canada.

Geography
Victoria, located on Route 70, is often referred to as the "crossroads to Trinity and Conception Bays." Victoria may have been named after the Queen.

Towns and communities nearby
Dotted around Victoria and surrounding areas are small fishing communities that were established due to the proximity of each community to the fishing grounds. Locally, Victoria goes by many nicknames, including "The Village" and "The Savage Hollar", although the use of these names has decreased in recent years. Among the communities within 15-minutes' driving distance from Victoria are:
 Perry's Cove
 Salmon Cove
 Freshwater
 Carbonear
 Bristol's Hope

History

19th century
 1817 – Victoria is being used as a source of lumber and firewood.
 1800s – Many residents of Victoria sign on for the Labrador Fishery with merchants in Carbonear, Harbour Grace and Northern Bay.

20th century
 1900s (early) – Other people find employment in lumbering, the railway and mining at Bell Island and Cape Breton.
 1905 – An electric power station is running in the community.
 1916 — Railway service on the Bay de Verde Branch Line is opened. 
 1921 – Sawmills are affected when a forest fire destroys much of the timber in the area. Nicholas Powell and Reuben, William and Nicholas Clarke are the merchants in Victoria.
 1924 – An independent congregation (later joins the Pentecostal Assemblies of Newfoundland) is established by Victoria native Eugene Vaters.
 1932 — Railway service is shut down.
 1935 - The Pentecostal Assemblies of Newfoundland has more than 300 members in Victoria. Twenty-eight families from Victoria, take part in a land settlement program and move to Markland.
 1985 – Victoria Electrical Museum is opened.

Economy
Industries / Economic Activity
 Agriculture - growing vegetables, hay, and raising cattle
 Forestry - sawmill
 Manufacturing/Retail - making barrels, tubs and wine barrels at the local cooperage located in the heritage park
 Construction - Home builders

Climate
The climate of the Atlantic Ocean and adjacent land areas is influenced by the temperatures of the surface waters and water currents as well as the winds blowing across the waters. Because of the oceans' great capacity for retaining heat, the climate of Victoria are moderate and free of extreme seasonal variations.

Precipitation falls on the area both as snow in the wintertime and moderate rainfall in summer.

The Gulf Stream and Labrador Current converge just off the coast of Newfoundland and provide for very dense fog that can linger in the area for days.

Demographics 

Tourist attractions
 Victoria Hydro Electric Museum
 Victoria Lifestyles Museum
 Victoria Heritage Village

See also
 List of cities and towns in Newfoundland and Labrador
 Monarchy in Newfoundland and Labrador

References

External links
Baccalieu Trail
Historical Baccalieu Trail
Statistics Canada
Victoria - Encyclopedia of Newfoundland and Labrador, vol.5, p. 480.

Towns in Newfoundland and Labrador